The Mayor of Hell is a 1933 American pre-Code Warner Brothers film starring James Cagney. The film was remade in 1938 as Crime School with Humphrey Bogart taking over James Cagney's role and Hell's Kitchen with Ronald Reagan in 1939.

Plot
Racketeer Patsy Gargan is made deputy commissioner of a reform school as a reward from his corrupt political cronies. Initially, he has no interest in the school, but his sympathy for the boys, who are abused and battered by a brutal, heartless warden and his thuggish guards convince him to take the job seriously, as does an attractive resident nurse named Dorothy.

Gargan sends Thompson, the superintendent, on vacation and, while he is gone, puts Dorothy's reform ideas into action. The school is functioning well under a system of self-government when Patsy is called back to the city to take care of some political business. Patsy shoots another man during a fight and has to go into hiding. Thompson returns to the school and convinces the boys that Patsy has abandoned them. He then starts running things the old way and, when Dorothy protests over the poor quality of the food served, he fires her. Then one of the boys, Johnny "Skinny" Stone, dies while in solitary confinement and the boys rebel.  Thompson is put on trial by the boys, who find him guilty.  Thompson, in a panic, jumps out a window to escape.  Pursued by the boys, many of whom carry torches, he scrambles up onto the roof of a barn.  The boys immediately set fire to the barn.   Dorothy, meanwhile, finds Patsy in his hideout and tells him the whole story. Patsy races back to the school to restore order, but Thompson is dead, having fallen from the roof of the barn. At the picture's end, Patsy decides to give up his political career and stay at the school permanently.

Cast

Production
The film originally went under the title Reform School. It took 36 days to shoot with a cost of $229,000.

Reception
On July 1, 1933, The New York Times review praised the film, saying: “The Warner Brothers, who made "I Am a Fugitive From a Chain Gang," have very nearly produced its equal in "The Mayor of Hell,"...[they] have uncovered a stimulating subject in the dark hard places of a boys' reform school. If James Cagney's affection for Madge Evans is a definite encumbrance in the film, the impact of its mounting bitterness and resentment against the penal system at the reform school is not to be denied. The wild fury of the boys in the closing scenes becomes contagious. There only can be tears to meet that touching scene in which Johnny, the little consumptive, dies on his cot while the other lads stand silently around him....The story is badly balanced because of an obtrusive gangster element and it bulges here and there to make room for Madge Evans... But the power, the vigor, the surge and flow of real issues and important psychological problems make ‘The Mayor of Hell’ an interesting and stimulating drama almost in spite of itself. Dudley Digges gives a superb portrait of a sniveling, knee-bending, wantonly domineering office holder as the warden. Arthur Byron is wise and troubled as the judge of the children's court. Mr. Cagney fills the part of the reformed ward heeler with the gusto and swagger one expects of him. As the leader of the boy inmates, Frankie Darrow gives a hard-faced performance that is genuinely disturbing. He is a boy prematurely bitter and cynical, prematurely grown out of the ways of boyhood. An excellent diversity of types has been collected for the school's population, and the lads provide many anonymously touching moments.”

Reviews
David Cornelius of DVD Talk wrote: "To its credit, the film pushes to make several of its minority characters complex and intelligent, but still, an ugly stereotype is an ugly stereotype..." He believed that Cagney's performance and many of the others were "quite strong".
TimeOut wrote: "Cloud nine tosh from the days when Warner movies preached that delinquents were just good kids in need of a helping hand", but concluded that "Despite the risible script, Cagney is as watchable as ever, and Mayo directs sleekly."

References

External links
 
 
 
 

1933 films
1933 crime drama films
American crime drama films
American black-and-white films
Films directed by Archie Mayo
Films directed by Michael Curtiz 
Warner Bros. films
1930s English-language films
1930s American films